James M. Feigley is a retired brigadier general in the United States Marine Corps.

Career 
Feigley joined the Marine Corps in 1972. Assignments he was given include serving as Project Manager for Headquarters Marine Corps and the Naval Sea Systems Command and Commander of the Marine Corps Systems Command. He retired in 2002.

Education 
 B.S. - University of Wisconsin-Oshkosh

Awards and decorations 
During his military career he was awarded the following, among others: Distinguished Service Medal, Legion of Merit, Meritorious Service Medal with gold star, Navy Commendation medaland,  Navy Achievement Medal with gold star.

References 

United States Marine Corps generals
University of Wisconsin–Oshkosh alumni
Living people
Recipients of the Legion of Merit
Year of birth missing (living people)